= Left progressive =

Left progressive may refer to:

- Left-wing politics
- Progressivism
